Anthony "Ngọc Trí" Phan (born November 27, 1993) is an American politician currently serving as a member of the Milpitas City Council. Elected at the age of 22, he is one of the youngest elected officials in the US.

Public service background
In 2013, Phan was unanimously appointed by the San Jose City Council to oversee the city's public library system as a member of the Library and Early Education Commission.

Milpitas City Council
Phan later moved to Milpitas, and in 2016 sought and won a seat on city council.

In June 2017, the California Fair Political Practices Commission confirmed it was investigating allegations that Phan had improperly reported campaign contributions and loans. He was found guilty and fined $15,000 from the State's Fair Practices Committee for three campaign violations. 

In February 2018, Phan rebuked the city's planning director Bradley Misner during a live council meeting. While discussing a council item pertaining to a study of retail spaces in Milpitas’ midtown area, Misner told the council that conducting the study would require “strategy and coordination” between his own department and the city’s economic development department. Phan expressed that he had “no confidence” in Misner’s ability to accomplish said coordination, warning Misner: “The next time that we’ll be having a conversation about coordination or strategy, [it] will be agendized as a public employee performance evaluation.” After City Attorney Chris Diaz then pointed out to the council that the only employees the council has hiring and firing authority over are the city attorney and city manager, Phan responded, "I don't care." Following comments from the acting city manager Dianne Thompson, Phan replied, “I don’t care what position is listed for the public employee performance evaluation. If it is for the city manager, I will agendize it as such.” 

On March 6, Milpitas resident Joseph Weinstein approached the dais during public forum to offer comments on Councilmember Phan’s threats to review the performance of the city’s planning director. In his remarks, Weinstein criticized Phan's actions, stating, "Council has no authority to discipline [or] influence city staff, except by working through the city manager, and then only by the majority vote of the council." During Weinstein's public remarks, Phan produced a bag of popcorn from beneath the dais and began eating from it. Phan then interrupted the public remarks to tell Weinstein to look at him, at which point Milpitas Mayor Tran called the meeting into recess.

In November 2018, Phan was linked to an anonymous political attack mailer against Milpitas Mayor Rich Tran associating Tran with the communist government of Vietnam.

During the 2022 race for Milpitas Mayor, Phan was criticized by fellow Milpitas councilmember and candidate for mayor Carmen Montano after a website appeared online under her name that redirected visitors to Phan's website. Asked for comment, Phan stated that Montano "was not digitally competent enough to register a domain name," but refused to comment as to whether or not he had purchased the domain name. Santa Clara County Deputy District Attorney John Chase wrote that the website appeared to violate cyber piracy laws that preclude registering a domain name under someone else's name in bad faith.

Electoral history

References 

American politicians of Vietnamese descent
California Democrats
Living people
People from Milpitas, California
Politicians from San Jose, California
University of California, Los Angeles alumni
1993 births
California city council members